The T2 Laboratories explosion and fire occurred on December 19, 2007, in Jacksonville, Florida, resulting in the deaths of four people and the injury of fourteen others. T2 Laboratories Inc. was a facility that specialized in the design and manufacture of specialty chemicals primarily for gasoline additives.

The explosion's force was equivalent to detonating 630 kg (1,400 lbs) of TNT and it spread debris up to 1,6 km (1 mile) from the plant. Following the explosion, every HAZMAT unit in Jacksonville and over 100 firefighters fought the ensuing blaze, which a spokesman termed a "hellish inferno".

The blast killed Robert Scott Gallagher, 49; Charles Budds Bolchoz, 48; Karey Renard Henry, 35; and Parrish Lamar Ashley, 36.  At the time of his death, Gallagher was Marketing Director for T2 Labs. Fourteen people were hospitalized for chemical exposure or their injuries after the blast. The company laid off its workers and shut down in the following months.

In September 2009, a report was released by the U.S. Chemical Safety and Hazard Investigation Board as to the cause of the accident. The explosion occurred in a 9.463 liter (2500-gallon) batch reactor during production of methylcyclopentadienyl manganese tricarbonyl (MCMT). The reactor cooling system, which lacked backups, failed; this led to a thermal runaway. Pressures rapidly reached 27,58 bar (400 PSI), bursting the rupture disc, but the relief was insufficient to prevent the continued runaway reaction. Nearby witnesses described a jet engine-like sound as high pressure gases vented from the reactor. At the same time pressure increased in the reactor, temperatures also increased in the reactor until the solvent (diglyme) reached its decomposition temperature. The pressure and temperature continued to increase until the reactor violently ruptured and the MCMT exploded, destroying the reactor. Damage from the explosion was severe enough that 4 buildings in the immediate vicinity of the plant were condemned.

References

External links
 CSB safety investigation video

Explosions in 2007
Disasters in Florida
Fires in Florida
Explosions in the United States
Industrial fires and explosions in the United States
2007 industrial disasters
2007 fires in the United States
Burned buildings and structures in the United States
2007 in Florida
December 2007 events in the United States
Northside, Jacksonville